Harriet Mann Miller (pen names Olive Thorne and Olive Thorne Miller; 25 June 1831 – 25 December 1918) was an American  author, naturalist, and ornithologist. She was one of the first three women raised to elective membership in the American Ornithologists' Union. Miller wrote stories for leading magazines. At the start of her career, her articles appeared under the pen name "Olive Thorne" while after marriage, she used the signature of "Olive Thorne Miller". Her books include: Little Folks in Feathers and Fur (1879), Queer Pets at Marcy’s (1880), Little People of Asia (1882), Birds’ Ways (1885), In Nesting Time (1888), and also a serial story entitled, "Nimpo’s Troubles", published in the St. Nicholas Magazine, in 1874.

Early life and education
Harriet Mann was the eldest of four children born to Seth Hunt Mann, a banker, and Mary Field (Holbrook) Mann in Auburn, New York on 25 June 1831. She was the oldest of four siblings, the three brothers all being younger than herself. Her youth was passed in cities from New York to Missouri, stopping from three to five years in each place. Western New York, Ohio, Wisconsin, and Illinois were respectively her home.

When Miller was eleven years old, the Mann family was in Ohio, where she attended private schools for five years. Miller was a bookworm from her early days. Exceedingly diffident, avoiding as far as she could all association with others, finding no sympathy with her peculiar tastes at home, she shrank more and more into herself, and lived more and more in her books. She was a shy, awkward, overgrown girl, with a painfully ready blush. To write was always her ambition, though she hated school compositions and shirked them when possible.

Career
She never sent anything to the press till nearly twenty years old, when she began writing short anonymous letters to the daily papers, on subjects of passing interest. At the age of twenty-three, in 1854, she married Watts Todd Miller, and added the name of Miller to her own. The couple would have four children. From 1858 to 1869, she put aside writing in order to raise her children. The couple lived in Chicago, Illinois, and after about 1875, in Brooklyn, New York.

It was not till the youngest was beyond babyhood did she touch literary work again. Toward the latter part of this domestic period, she began to write an occasional letter to a paper, when feelings grew too strong for silence. It was then she assumed the name Olive Thorne, and later when the pseudonym was somewhat widely known, and the possession of two names became inconvenient, she added her own married name Miller.

She began for children, and for several years she never attempted writing for others. Miller's first article for children, on the making of china, was published in 1870. Gradually, she drifted into sketches of natural history, having a fresh, vivid way of depicting the personality of bird or beast, that made it an acquaintance at once, and proved irresistible to every youngster. These early sketches, published everywhere, were collected in 1873 and made into a book which had a steady, regular sale, Little Folk in Feathers and Fur, appearing in the mid-1870s. Later she made a second collection of her animal sketches which she called Queer Pets at Marcy's. Meanwhile, she wrote her first long story, "Nimpo's Troubles," which ran as a serial in St. Nicholas Magazine during its first years.  A year or two after she wrote her fourth and last book for children, Little People of Asia. Her first use of the pseudonym, Olive Thorne Miller, was in 1879.

In 1880, she became an avid bird watcher, introduced to the study of birds by Sara A. Hubbard, director of the Illinois Audubon Society.  Miller studied captive birds, as well as birds in the wild in a series of field trips across the country during the period 1883–1903. 
Her work in this field, after publication in The Atlantic and other magazines, was published in several volumes. The first of eleven bird-related books, Bird Ways, appeared in 1885; In Nesting Time followed.  In addition to writing on birds and their behavior, she contributed to the journal of the Audubon Society. She was a proponent of the movement to prevent hunting of birds for use of their plumes in the millinery trade. In 1901, along with Mabel Osgood Wright and Florence Merriam Bailey, Miller became one of the first three women raised to elective membership in the American Ornithologists' Union.

Miller published articles in religious weeklies and other publications, among them Harper's Weekly and the Chicago Tribune. Across her writing career, she produced an estimated 780 articles, one booklet on birds, and 24 complete books. Her work was acknowledged by professional biologists for its highly accurate research and observation.

After the death of her husband in 1904, Miller moved to Los Angeles, California. She died there on 25 December 1918.

Selected works

 Sick and in Prison (1873)
 Nimpo's Troubles (1880)
 The Bird of Solitude (1884)
 A Bit of Bird-life (1885)
 A Ruffian in Feathers (1885)
 Queer Pets and their Doings (1885)
 Flutterbudget (1887)
 The Woman's Club: a Practical Guide and Hand-book (1891)
 Kristy's Surprise Party (1905)
 Kristy's Rainy Day Picnic (1906)
 What Happened to Barbara (1907)
 The Children's Book of Birds (1915)

As Olive Thorne
 

As Olive Thorne Miller
    Illustrated by J. C. Beard.
  
  
  
  
  
  
  
  Illustrated by J. Carter Beard.
  With eight colored and twelve plain plates and twenty figures in the text. 
  With eight colored plates from designs by Louis Agassiz Fuertes, and sixteen other full-page illustrations.
  With illustrations by Louis Agassiz Fuertes.

References

Attribution

Bibliography

External links

 
 
 
 

1831 births
1918 deaths
American children's writers
American ornithologists
Women ornithologists
American naturalists
People from Auburn, New York
Writers from Los Angeles
Scientists from New York (state)